The Alliance Terminal Railroad  is a Class III terminal railroad in Haslet, Texas, responsible for the switching and operations of the Alliance Intermodal Facility. It is owned by OmniTRAX and subleases the terminal yard from Quality Terminal Services, also owned by OmniTRAX.

References

External links

 OmniTRAX Website for Alliance Terminal Railroad

Switching and terminal railroads
Texas railroads
OmniTRAX